Rajnish Kumar Mittal (born 18 September 1974) is the President of Municipal Council Nabha and  an Indian politician.

Career 
He served as President Of Municipal Council Nabha. He was elected as the Civic Body Chief on 11 May 2017. and giving a monthly allowance to The Gaushala to control the increasing numbers of stray animals.

References

Living people
People from Punjab, India
Indian National Congress politicians from Punjab, India
1974 births